Ming-Che Shih is an agricultural researcher.

Career
They are a Distinguished Research Fellow at the Agricultural Biotechnology Research Center of Academia Sinica.

In 2022 they were elected to the Academia Sinica.

References

Members of Academia Sinica